Munshiganj Stadium, officially Shaheed Bir Sreshtho Flight Lieutenant Matiur Rahman Stadium, is a multi-purpose stadium located near Haraganga College, Munshigonj, Bangladesh. The ground is used for football and cricket.

See also
 Stadiums in Bangladesh
 List of football stadiums in Bangladesh
 List of cricket grounds in Bangladesh

References

Football venues in Bangladesh
Cricket grounds in Bangladesh